This page is a list of the Jacksonville Jaguars NFL Draft selections.  The first draft the Jaguars participated in was 1995, in which they made offensive tackle Tony Boselli of USC their first-ever selection.

Key

1995 Draft

1996 Draft

1997 Draft

1998 Draft

1999 Draft

2000 Draft

2001 Draft

2002 Draft

2003 Draft

2004 Draft

2005 Draft

2006 Draft

2007 Draft

2008 Draft

2009 Draft

2010 Draft

2011 Draft

2012 Draft

2013 Draft

2014 Draft

2015 Draft

2016 Draft

2017 Draft

2018 Draft

2019 Draft

2020 Draft

2021 Draft

2022 Draft

See also
History of the Jacksonville Jaguars
List of professional American football drafts

References
Jacksonville Jaguars draft history at DraftHistory.com

draft history
National Football League Draft history by team